A Western Demon is a 1922 American silent Western film directed by Robert McKenzie.  The film stars William Fairbanks, Marilyn Mills, and Monte Montague. The film was restored by The Film Foundation and the Academy of Motion Picture Arts and Sciences Film Archive.

Plot
Ned Underwood rescues a drowning child and in doing so, catches the eye of Rose Dale.  Rose finds that Ned is a passenger on the same train headed west.  In speaking with Ned, Rose tells him of rustling happening on her ranch, after which Ned offers to go undercover as a dishwasher at the ranch to find out about the rustlers.  Joe Dalton, the ranch foreman, is trying to gain the ranch for himself by scaring Rose away.

Cast
 William Fairbanks as Ned Underwood
 Marilyn Mills as Rose Dale
 Monte Montague as Joe Dalton
 Murray Miller as The bandit
 Billy Franey as The cook

References

American black-and-white films
1922 Western (genre) films
Silent American Western (genre) films
1920s American films